Noppawan Lertcheewakarn was the defending champion, but lost to Stefanie Vögele in the first round.

Kimiko Date-Krumm won the tournament, defeating Yulia Putintseva in the final, 6–1, 3–6, 6–4.

Seeds

Main draw

Finals

Top half

Bottom half

References 
 Main draw

Al Habtoor Tennis Challenge - Singles
Al Habtoor Tennis Challenge
2012 in Emirati tennis